Autarcontes is a genus of beetles in the family Buprestidae, containing the following species:

 Autarcontes abdominalis Waterhouse, 1887
 Autarcontes brasiliensis Obenberger, 1922
 Autarcontes cortezi Obenberger, 1958
 Autarcontes eucalopterus Obenberger, 1958
 Autarcontes guatemozin Obenberger, 1958
 Autarcontes lopezi Fisher, 1925
 Autarcontes montezuma Obenberger, 1958
 Autarcontes mucoreipennis Obenberger, 1958
 Autarcontes mucoreus (Klug, 1825)
 Autarcontes negrei Cobos, 1961
 Autarcontes pictiventris Waterhouse, 1887
 Autarcontes panus Waterhouse, 1887

References

Buprestidae genera